Charles Cholmondeley (12 January 1685 – 1756) of Vale Royal, Cheshire, was a British landowner and Tory politician who sat in the House of Commons between 1710 and 1756.

Early life
thumb|Vale Royal Abbey
Cholmondeley was the eldest surviving son of Thomas Cholmondeley of Vale Royal and his wife Anne St John, daughter of Sir Walter St John, 3rd Baronet of Battersea and Lydiard Tregoze, Wilts. In 1702 he succeeded his father to the estates at Vale Royal.  He was admitted at St. John’s College, Cambridge on 13 October. 1701 and at Middle Temple in August 1709. He married Essex Pitt,  daughter of Thomas Pitt (governor) of Stratford Wiltshire on 22 July 1714.

Career
At the 1710 general election Cholmondeley was elected Tory Member of Parliament for Cheshire in a contest. He was  a member of the October Club and listed as a ‘worthy patriot’. He increasingly involved himself in the attempts of Tory back-benchers to influence policy. By 1712, he changed his allegiance from the October Club to the March Club. He was returned unopposed in 1713. Some of his Tory supporters in  Cheshire abandoned him at the  1715 general election  and he was defeated at the poll.
 
When the Duke of Ormonde fled abroad in July 1715, Cholmondeley drank the Jacobite toast with Sir Henry Bunbury and Lord Barrymore. He was returned as MP for Cheshire again in  a contest at the 1722 general election. In Parliament, he voted consistently with the opposition. He was elected in a  contest again at the  1727 general election. He spoke against the government on the repeal of the Septennial Act on 13 March 1734. At the 1734 general election  he was re-elected in a contest again. From then on, he was returned as MP for Cheshire unopposed in 1741, 1747 and  1754 and continued to vote regularly against the government.

Death and legacy
Cholmondeley died on 30 March 1756. He had three sons and five daughters. Two of his sons predeceased him and he was succeeded in both his estates and his parliamentary sea by his son Thomas Cholmondeley.

References

1685 births
1756 deaths
Members of the Parliament of Great Britain for English constituencies
British MPs 1710–1713
British MPs 1713–1715
British MPs 1722–1727
British MPs 1727–1734
British MPs 1734–1741
British MPs 1741–1747
British MPs 1747–1754
British MPs 1754–1761